S chips are Chinese companies listed on the Singapore Exchange. Their shares are known as S shares. S chips are incorporated in Singapore, the British Virgin Islands, the Cayman Islands and Bermuda and have their business operations in mainland China.

Some S chips were beset by corporate governance and accounting problems, resulting in reputational issues that led to share price declines in 2009. The main difference between S chips and P chips is the exchange on which they are traded.

An index that covers the prices of S-Chips is the FTSE ST China Index. From January 2008 to October 2009, the FTSE ST China Index had a return of −60%, as opposed to a return of −20% for the Hang Seng China Enterprises Index, which covers the prices of H shares.

See also
 Chip
 A share
 B share
 Red chip
 P chip
 Blue chip
 N share
 L share
 G share
 China Concepts Stock
 Green chip

References 

Stock market terminology
 
 
Economy of Singapore
Finance in China